Laudiel Negrón (born 20 September 1952) is a Puerto Rican boxer. He competed in the men's light welterweight event at the 1972 Summer Olympics.

References

1952 births
Living people
Puerto Rican male boxers
Olympic boxers of Puerto Rico
Boxers at the 1972 Summer Olympics
Place of birth missing (living people)
Light-welterweight boxers